Adelina Yzac (born 11 June 1954 in Périgord Noir) is an author who writes in both Occitan and French. She went to school in Sarlat and specialized in literature, Spanish and linguistics at the university of Montpellier. She's also a playwright and a story writer. Her style has always been heavily influenced by the literature of Spain and Spanish-speaking Latin America.

Bibliography

Works in Occitan
 D'enfança d'en fàcia (Facing Youth), 1998, with the author's French translation
 Un Tren per tu tota sola (A Train for You Only), 2002, with the author's French translation

Works in French

Adult books
 La Nuit fut si lente à couler, 1999
 D'enfance d'en face, 1998, awarded the Joan Bodon prize in 1999
 Le Dernier de la lune, 2000, awarded the Alain-Fournier prize in 2001
 Enea la cathare, 2000
 Danse la vigne, 2001.
 Un Train pour toi toute seule, awarded the Jaufre Rudel prize in 2002
 Le Temps d'un retour, 2002
 Mondane de Fénelon, 2003
 Le Jardin de Jeanne, 2005

Children's books
 Les Larmes de mon père, 1995
 La Légende oubliée, 1996
 Il y avait une fois, 1997
 Histoires courtes et amusantes d'animaux de la ferme followed by Un drôle d'œuf, 1998
 Enéa la cathare, 2000
 Calicobat, 2003
 Tout Doudou Caramel Mou, 2002
 Grain de Riz, 2003
 Le Prince qui voit juste, 2003
 Le Jour des oies sauvages, awarded the Octogones prize in 2004
 La Princesse du jour et le prince de la nuit, 2004
 Le Radeau des poèmes, 2005
 TOC, 2005
 L'Enfant à la bouche de silence, 2006
 Les Trois rives du fleuve, 2006
 L'Almanavache, 2006

External links
  (in French]
 Edicions Jorn (in Occitan]
 A review of Un Tren per tu tota sola (in Occitan)

1954 births
Living people
People from Dordogne
French-language Occitan writers
Occitan-language Occitan writers
20th-century French women writers
20th-century French non-fiction writers
21st-century French women writers
French women children's writers
French children's writers
Prix Alain-Fournier winners
21st-century French non-fiction writers